Partido Navoteño is the ruling political party in Navotas, Philippines, founded by Toby Tiangco in 2004. It was previously a local affiliate of the NPC, United Nationalist Alliance, and Hugpong ng Pagbabago, respectively.

Electoral performance

Mayor

Vice mayor

House of Representatives

City council

References

External links
 

Conservative parties in the Philippines
Political parties established in 2004
Political parties in Metro Manila
2004 establishments in the Philippines
Politics of Navotas